Upiralovo is a rural locality (a village) in Krasnopolyanskoye Rural Settlement, Nikolsky District, Vologda Oblast, Russia. The population was 34 as of 2002. There are 2 streets.

Geography 
Upiralovo is located 29 km south of Nikolsk (the district's administrative centre) by road. Skochkovo is the nearest rural locality.

References 

Rural localities in Nikolsky District, Vologda Oblast